Kisk may refer to:
 Kisk, Razavi Khorasan (كسك - Kisk)